Epidural steroid injection (ESI) is a technique in which corticosteroids and a local anesthetic are injected into the epidural space around the spinal cord in an effort to improve spinal stenosis, spinal disc herniation, or both. It is of benefit with a rare rate of major side effects.

Medical uses 

Epidural steroid injection for sciatica and spinal stenosis is of unclear effect. The evidence to support use in the cervical spine is not very good. When medical imaging is not used to determine the proper spot for injection, ESI benefits appear to be of short-term benefit when used in sciatica. It is unclear if ESI is useful for chronic pain after spinal surgery.

Side effects 

Major side effects are rare. These include loss of vision, stroke, paralysis, or death when the corticosteroids are infected, as in a 2012 meningitis outbreak. Another study found an increased odds of developing epidural lipomatosis, independent of body mass index (BMI) or other factors.

Technique 

Elective spinal injections should be performed with imaging guidance, such as fluoroscopy or the use of a radiocontrast agent, unless that guidance is contraindicated. Imaging guidance ensures the correct placement of the needle and maximizes the physician's ability to make an accurate diagnosis and administer effective therapy. Without imaging, the risk increases for the injection to be incorrectly placed, and this would in turn lower the therapy's efficacy and increase subsequent risk of need for more treatment. While traditional techniques without image guidance, also known as blind injections, can assure a degree of accuracy using anatomical landmarks, it has been shown in studies that image guidance provides much more reliable localization and accuracy in comparison.

References 

Analgesics
Bones of the vertebral column
Medical treatments
Neurology procedures